, provisional designation: , is a dark minor planet in the outer Solar System, classified as centaur, approximately  in diameter. It was discovered on 9 December 2001, by David C. Jewitt, Scott S. Sheppard, and Jan Kleyna observing from the Mauna Kea Observatory. The object is currently trapped in a 1:1 mean-motion resonance with Neptune following a path of the horseshoe type.

Orbit and classification 
 follows a very eccentric orbit (0.68) with perihelion just inside the orbit of Saturn, aphelion in the trans-Neptunian belt and a semi-major axis of 28.9 AU. The orbital inclination of this object is moderate at 12.6º.

Resonance with Neptune 
 was identified as trapped in a 1:1 mean-motion resonance with Neptune and 1:2 with Uranus by T. Gallardo in 2006. The object is dynamically unstable and it entered the region of the giant planets relatively recently, perhaps 50,000 years ago, from the scattered disk. It follows a short-lived horseshoe orbit around Neptune.

Physical characteristics 
The object has an estimated diameter of 12.5 km and it was classified as an inactive centaur by David Jewitt. Observations by the NEOWISE mission gave a larger diameter of 37.7 kilometers and an albedo of 0.041. It has an absolute magnitude is 11.1.

See also

References

External links
 2001 XA255, Jewitt, D. C., Sheppard, S. S., Kleyna, J., & Marsden, B. G. 2002, Minor Planet Electronic Circular, 2002-A85.
 The Active Centaurs, Jewitt, D. C. 2009, Astronomical Journal, Volume 137, Number 5, pp. 4296–4312.
  data at MPC
 Atlas of the mean motion resonances in the Solar System Gallardo, T. 2006, Icarus, Volume 184, Issue 1, pp. 29–38.
Four temporary Neptune co-orbitals: (148975) 2001 XA255, (310071) 2010 KR59, (316179) 2010 EN65, and 2012 GX17 de la Fuente Marcos, C., & de la Fuente Marcos, R. 2012, Astronomy and Astrophysics, Volume 547, id.L2, 7 pp.
 IAU list of centaurs and scattered-disk objects
 IAU list of trans-neptunian objects
 Another list of TNOs
 

Neptune co-orbital minor planets
Centaurs (small Solar System bodies)
Discoveries by David C. Jewitt
Discoveries by Scott S. Sheppard
Discoveries by Jan Kleyna
20011209